Adoxophyes beijingensis is a species of moth of the family Tortricidae. It is found in China (Liaoning, Hebei, Shandong) and Japan.

There are three generations per year in Liaoning. The species overwinters in the larval stage under the bark of the host plant. After hibernation, larvae start feeding in May. Adults have been recorded on wing from mid-June to late June, from late June to early August and from early September to mid-September.

The larvae feed on Malus pumila and Prunus persica.

References

Moths described in 1997
Adoxophyes
Moths of Asia
Moths of Japan